Rugare is an African unisex given name. Notable people with the name include:

 Rugare Gumbo (born 1940), Zimbabwean politician
 Rugare Magarira (born 1997), Zimbabwean cricketer

African masculine given names